Amirhossein Jeddi (born 18 October 1998) is an Iranian professional footballer who plays as a right-back for Persian Gulf Pro League club Paykan.

Style of play

This young player plays at a high level using his speed and power of play, and we will definitely hear more from him in the future.

Career statistics

References

1998 births
Living people
People from Qom
Iranian footballers
Association football defenders
Saba players
Paykan F.C. players
Aluminium Arak players
Persian Gulf Pro League players
Azadegan League players
Iran youth international footballers